Bjørnbakknosi  is a hill in Hemsedal in Buskerud  Norway.

References

Hemsedal
Mountains of Viken